Summer Nights may refer to:
 Les nuits d'été ("Summer Nights"), a song cycle by Hector Berlioz
 Summernights, a 1977 album by Silver Convention
 Summer Nights (Joe Pass album), 1989
 Summer Nights (Twice EP), 2018
 "Summer Nights" (Grease song), from the 1971 stage musical and 1978 film Grease
 "Summer Nights" (Rascal Flatts song), 2009
 "Summer Nights" (Tiësto song), 2016
 Summer Nights, a 1998 album by Stevie B, or the title song
 "Summer Nights", a song by Cassie Steele from Destructo Doll
 "Summer Nights", a song by Lil Rob from Twelve Eighteen (Pt. I)
 "Summer Nights", a song by Marianne Faithfull
 "Summer Nights", a song by Survivor from Premonition
 "Summer Nights", a song by Van Halen from 5150
 "Summer Nights", a song by Vanessa Amorosi from Hazardous
 Summer Nights (concert residency), by Olivia Newton-John (2014–2015)
 Summer Nights (1944 film), a German comedy film
 Summer Nights (2014 film), a French drama film